The fifth series of Made in Chelsea, a British structured-reality television program, began airing on 8 April 2013 on E4. The series ended on June 17, 2013 after 11 episodes and an end of season reunion episode featuring the cast and hosted by Rick Edwards. This was the first series to include new cast members Fran and Olivia Newman-Young, Phoebe Lettice-Thompson and Alex Mytton. It was the only series to feature Josh Acoombs and Oscar Ligenza. Series 5 also saw the departures of original cast members Ollie Locke and Millie Mackintosh as well as Richard Dinan and Ashley James. Major themes in the series included the end of Spencer and Louise's relationship after the revelation that Spencer cheated, Louise and Spencer beginning new romances with Andy and Lucy respectively,  Ashley struggling to come to terms with Ollie's sexuality,  Jamie realising he has feelings for Phoebe despite being in a relationship with Tara, and Francis and Proudlock once again competing for the same girl.

Cast

Episodes

Ratings

External links

References

2013 British television seasons
Made in Chelsea seasons